Warned Off is a 1930 British silent film directed by Walter West and starring Tony Wylde, Chili Bouchier and Queenie Thomas. It was made at Cricklewood Studios.

Cast
 Tony Wylde - Frank Cuthbert 
 Chili Bouchier - Florrie Greville 
 Queenie Thomas - Lady Violet 
 Evan Thomas - Colonel Cornwallis 
 Wally Patch - Miles 
 Bert Tracy - Diggle
 Forbes Dawson - Lord Winterbottom

References

External links

1930 films
British silent feature films
Films directed by Walter West
Films shot at Cricklewood Studios
British black-and-white films
British and Dominions Studios films
1930 drama films
1930s sports films
1930s English-language films